American country music artist Crystal Gayle has released 15 music videos and 68 singles, including six as a collaborative artist, four as a featured artist, and six promos. Gayle's debut single was 1970's "I've Cried (The Blue Right Out of My Eyes)" via Decca Records, which reached number 23 on the Billboard Hot Country Singles chart. Encouraged by her sister to develop her own musical style, Gayle signed with United Artists Records where she began recording country pop material. That year "Wrong Road Again" reached number 6 on the country chart, launching several major hits including "I'll Do It All Over Again" and her first #1 hit, "I'll Get Over You". She released "Don't It Make My Brown Eyes Blue" in 1977 which became her signature song and brought her crossover pop success. It topped the country chart, reached number 2 on the Billboard Hot 100, and became an international hit. Its success elevated her career and was followed by three more number-one country singles: "Ready for the Times to Get Better", "Why Have You Left the One You Left Me For", and the top-twenty pop hit "Talking in Your Sleep".

Transitioning to Columbia Records in 1979, "Half the Way" became Gayle's third top-20 pop hit and reached number 2 on the Billboard country chart. She continued to regularly top the country chart, with crossovers into the Hot 100 during the 1980s. Examples include 1980's "It's Like We Never Said Goodbye" and "If You Ever Change Your Mind". "The Woman in Me" (1981) reached number 3 on the country chart and number 76 on the Hot 100. From 1982 to 1984, she had four number-one country hits, including the crossover successes "Baby, What About You" and "The Sound of Goodbye". Featured on Eddie Rabbitt's "You and I" (1982), she garnered a 10th chart-topping country single and second top-10 on the Hot 100. The number-one hit "Makin' Up for Lost Time" (1985) started a two-year collaboration with Gary Morris. In 1986, a cover of "Cry" and the original "Straight to the Heart" became her final number-one hits, as toward the end of the decade, her success declined. Her 1990 cover of "Never Ending Song of Love" became her last appearance on the Billboard Hot Country Singles chart. Gayle has continued issuing singles and has been featured on other artists' releases. In 2010, she was featured on Mishavonna's holiday single "Christmas Everywhere".

Singles

As lead artist

As a collaborative artist

As a featured artist

Other singles

Music videos

References

Notes

External links 
 Crystal Gayle discography at Rate Your Music

Discographies of American artists
Country music discographies